The CANT 18 was a flying boat trainer developed in Italy in the 1920s to prepare pilots for flying boat airliners. A development of the CANT 7, it incorporated various aerodynamic and hydrodynamic refinements. While remaining broadly similar in configuration, the new design replaced the CANT 7's conventional struts with Warren truss bracing for the wings. Most of the aircraft produced were used by S.I.S.A.

Operators
 
Società Italiana Servizi Aerei (S.I.S.A.)
 
Uruguayan Navy

Specifications

See also

References

 
 aerei-italiani.net

CANT 18
1920s Italian civil trainer aircraft
Flying boats
Single-engined pusher aircraft
Biplanes